Powell Peak is a summit in Grand County, Colorado, in the United States.

The peak was named for John Wesley Powell.

Further reading
 James Dziezynski, Best Summit Hikes in Colorado, P 140

References

Mountains of Grand County, Colorado
Mountains of Colorado